Kara Davud Pasha, also known as simply Davud Pasha or as Hain Davud Pasha ("Davud Pasha the Traitor"), was an Ottoman statesman who became briefly Grand Vizier of the Ottoman Empire in 1622, during the reign of his brother-in-law Mustafa I.

His first position was of Kethüda under Mehmet III (1595-1603) then he was named Kapıcıbaşı under Ahmed I (1603-1617, son of Sultan Mehmed III and one of his consorts Handan Hatun). He married in 1604 (consummated in March 1606) an Ahmed's half-sister, Şah Sultan, daughter of Sultan Mehmed III and an his other consort Halime Hatun. They had a son and a daughter whose name are unknown. He became Kapudan Pasha for a brief time during the first reign of Mustafa I (1617-1618). He was appointed Beylerbey of Rumelia and shortly afterwards vizier.

He was Grand Vizier on 20 May 1622 during Mustafa I's reign through the influence of Halime Sultan, Mustafa's mother and his own mother-in-law.

He carried out the execution of Osman II, cutting off his ear as proof to give to Halime that Osman was dead. However, he was dismissed on 13 June 1622, and was tortured until his death because he executed Osman II without the confirmation of the Sultan (Mustafa). The supposed reason of Davud'execution was Halime's fear of the riots he faced due to the execution of Osman, given that he had been inhumanly executed by Davud. The army went against him and the people who were included in the execution of Osman were executed with him on 18 January 1623 by different methods. He was buried in Murat Pasha Mosque, Aksaray.

Family 

He married Şah Sultan, daughter of Mehmed III and Halime Hatun, in 1604 (consummated in March 1606). The couple had two children, a son and a daughter.

In popular culture 

 In the 2015 Turkish television series Muhteşem Yüzyıl: Kösem, Davud was portrayed by turkish actor Mustafa Üstündağ. 
 Şah Sultan (Davud's wife) by Melisa Ilayda Ozcanik (young role) and Öykü Karayel (adult role) with name Dilruba Sultan (daughter of Mehmed III and Halime Sultan), because when the series was shot the names of Mehmed's daughters were not known.

References

17th-century Grand Viziers of the Ottoman Empire
People from the Ottoman Empire of Bosnian descent
Damats
Kapudan Pashas
1570 births
1623 deaths